Vaniamkulam is a gram panchayat in the Palakkad district, state of Kerala, India. It is the local government organisation that serves the villages of Vaniyamkulam-I and Vaniyamkulam-II.

Educational institutions 
TRYWIN INSTITUTE OF WINNERS, near post office Vaniamkulam

References 

Gram panchayats in Palakkad district